= Challavaripalli =

- Village
- Interactive map of Challavaripalli
- Location in Andhra Pradesh, India Challavaripalli (India)
- Coordinates: 15°00′40″N 79°33′16″E
- Country: India
- State: Andhra Pradesh
- District: Nellore

Languages
  - Official: Telugu
- Time zone: UTC+5:30 (IST)
- PIN: 524221
- Vehicle registration: AP

Challavaripalli is a small village in Garimenapenta panchyat. It is part of Kondapuram mandal of Nellore district the Indian state of Andhra Pradesh.

== Education ==
MPPS Challavaripalli was established in 1968 and offers primary education for children in Challavaripalli and nearby villages.
